The MGWR Class 7–12 were a set of six  locomotives introduced in 1889/90 by the Midland Great Western Railway (MGWR) of Ireland replacing the MGWR Class 18 with the same names and numbers.  They were withdrawn from 1909 to 1922 with none surviving into service with Great Southern Railways (GSR).  Their construction included iron frame plates, steel standard goods boilers, automatic brakes and a redesigned motion incorporating four slidebars.  They were noted for economical coal consumption.

References

2-4-0 locomotives
5 ft 3 in gauge locomotives
7
Scrapped locomotives
Railway locomotives introduced in 1889
Steam locomotives of Ireland